Lambi is a Panchayat village in Malout tehsil of  Sri Muktsar Sahib district in the state of Punjab, India.

Ex Chief Minister of Punjab Parkash Singh Badal has record five consecutive wins from 1997 to 2017 contesting from Lambi Assembly Constituency.

Geography 
Lambi is located between Malout and Mandi Dabwali on National Highway No. 9 in Punjab State.

Demographics 
As per 2011 Census of India Lambi had a total population of 5,053 of which 2,602 (53%) were males and 2,451 (47%) were females. Population below 6 years was 563. The literacy rate was 62.14% of the population over 6 years. The sex ratio was 942 females per thousand males.

Transportation

Road 
Lambi is well connected by road network by virtue of being located on NH 9.

Railway 
Nearest railway stations to Lambi are Gidderbaha railway station, Malout railway station and Mandi Dabwali (Hry) railway station.

Postal services 
Lambi post office is a Sub Office of Indian Postal Service. The Pin code of Lambi village is 152113.

References 

Villages in Sri Muktsar Sahib district